Qaleh Juq (also Romanized as Qal‘eh Jūq; also known as Kalandzhik, Kalanjik, Qal‘eh Jaq, and Qal‘eh Jīk) is a village in Yurchi-ye Sharqi Rural District, Kuraim District, Nir County, Ardabil Province, Iran. At the 2006 census, its population was 241, in 48 families.

References 

Tageo

Towns and villages in Nir County